The BMW Hydrogen 7 is a limited production hydrogen internal combustion engine vehicle built from 2005-2007 by German automobile manufacturer BMW.  The car is based on BMW’s traditional petrol-powered BMW 7 Series (E65) line of vehicles, and more specifically the 760Li.  It uses the same 6-litre V-12 motor as does the 760i and 760Li; however, it has been modified to also allow for the combustion of hydrogen as well as petrol, making it a bivalent engine.  Unlike many other current hydrogen powered vehicles like those being produced by Hyundai, Honda, General Motors, and Daimler AGwhich use fuel cell technology and hydrogen to produce electricity to power the vehiclethe BMW Hydrogen 7 burns the hydrogen in an internal combustion engine.

Production

BMW claims the Hydrogen 7 is the “world’s first production-ready hydrogen vehicle”; thus far, the Hydrogen 7 has been released to select high-profile lessees.  Only 100 total vehicles were produced to put their technology to the test.  BMW said it chose public figures such as politicians, media figures, businessmen and big names in the entertainment industry such as 2007 Academy Award-winning director Florian Henckel von Donnersmarck and the chairman of Sixt AG, Erich Sixt, because “they would be ideal ambassadors” for hydrogen fuel and could help spread awareness of the need for such technologies.

There is doubt over whether or not this technology will ever be put into larger production, even if hydrogen fuel technology reaches the point of economical and “green” feasibility, as well as to have the infrastructure required to put hydrogen vehicles in demand.  The Hydrogen 7 uses more fuel than many trucks, consuming 13.9 L/100 km for petrol and 50 L/100 km for hydrogen.  The following table shows the consumption (L/100 km) and fuel economy (mpg) for both Imperial and US gallons.

The difference in fuel consumption is largely due to the different energy density with gasoline (petrol) yielding 34.6 MJ/L and liquid hydrogen yielding 10.1 MJ/L.  Based on these energy density figures, one would expect 47.6 L/100 km for hydrogen based on 13.9 L/100 km for gasoline (petrol); which is very close to the stated 50.0 L/100 km.  Using hydrogen in an internal combustion engine as a source of energy is far less efficient than fuel cell technologies; however, this is a system that is in production (albeit limited) now.

Nonetheless, hydrogen fuel (whether converted to energy in fuel cells or burned in an internal combustion engines) is not as green as it may seem; particularly so when you also consider that producing liquid hydrogen requires vast amounts of energy.  It will also be more expensive than its sister the 760Li (no retail price has been announced), which is BMW’s biggest and most expensive sedan, with a base price tag of over $118,000, thus further diminishing its widespread appeal.  As of November, 2006, there were only five filling stations in the entire world that supported BMW’s filling technology, furthering the obstacles to making this car usable.

Use of hydrogen technology

The BMW Hydrogen 7 burns hydrogen in an internal combustion engine (ICE). The combustion technique is a combination of spark-ignition and diesel combustion systems using surface ignition, subsequently followed by a diffusion type of combustion. This combustion system matches the efficiency values of the currently best turbodiesel engines at a maximum of 42 percent. The car can also switch seamlessly between hydrogen and gasoline at the touch of a button on the steering wheel, and will do so automatically when one of the fuels is depleted.

To stay a liquid, hydrogen must be cooled and maintained at cryogenic temperatures of, at warmest, .  When not using fuel, the Hydrogen 7’s hydrogen tank starts to warm and the hydrogen starts to vaporize.  Once the tank’s internal pressure reaches 87 psi, at roughly 17 hours of non-use, the tank will safely vent the building pressure. Over 10–12 days, it will completely lose the contents of the tank because of this.

There have been some accusations of greenwash in reference to their BMW Hydrogen 7. Some critics claim that the emissions produced during hydrogen fuel production outweigh the reduction of tailpipe emissions, and that the Hydrogen 7 is a distraction from more immediate, practical solutions for car pollution. The BBC's Jorn Madslien questioned whether the Hydrogen 7 was "a truly green initiative or merely a cynical marketing ploy"

Specifications
The car is powered by a 6.0 litre V12 engine capable of running on both premium gasoline and hydrogen fuel. In comparison, Honda's FCX Clarity gets about  liquid hydrogen equivalent mileage.

See also
 Bivalent (engine)
 List of hydrogen internal combustion engine vehicles

Notes

External links

  BMW's hydrogen car: beauty or beast?
 Article by GreenerMachine.com
  Cars.com BMW Hydrogen 7 Prototype

Hydrogen 7
Hydrogen cars